John Kennard may refer to:

John Kennard (co-driver) (born 1959), rally co-driver from New Zealand
John Kennard (cricketer) (1884–1949), English first-class cricketer
John H. Kennard (1836–1887), Louisiana Supreme Court justice

See also

 Jonathan Kennard (born 1985), British racecar driver
 Kennard (surname)